Tony Lee Bettenhausen Jr. (October 30, 1951 – February 14, 2000) was a Champ Car team owner and driver who died in a 2000 plane crash. He was the son of former 14-time Indianapolis 500 competitor Tony Bettenhausen and the brother of 21-time Indy 500 racer Gary Bettenhausen. Another brother, Merle Bettenhausen, was critically injured in his only Indy Car start.

Career
As a driver, he started 11 Indianapolis 500 races, scoring a best finish of 7th his rookie year in the 1981 race. He took his trademark No. 16 into team ownership in 1985, initially using March and Lola chassis, then purchasing year-old Penske chassis and then entering and qualifying two new Penskes for the 1993 race.  One, number 76, was driven by himself, the other by former Formula One driver Stefan Johansson.  A number of successful drivers passed through Bettenhausen's Alumax car, including Johansson for the first few years as well as four-time Indianapolis 500 winner Hélio Castroneves and former IndyCar rookie of the year Patrick Carpentier.

Bettenhausen also competed in 33 NASCAR Winston Cup Series events in his career, most coming in 1974 when he scored a career best 7th-place effort at Richmond International Raceway.

A difficult 1999 plagued by a lack of sponsorship and a series of pay-drivers saw the team take on a new look in 2000 with the hiring of Michel Jourdain Jr. and his Herdez sponsorship.

The family holds the dubious distinction of the most combined starts in the famous race without a victory.

Death
Bettenhausen died in a light plane crash en route from Indianapolis to Homestead, Florida that went down in Harrison County, Kentucky.  Bettenhausen's wife Shirley, the daughter of former Indianapolis racing star Jim McElreath, as well as business associates Russ Roberts and Larry Rangel were also killed.  His legacy of the team lived on under the ownership of former Pacific Racing F1 team owner Keith Wiggins and was renamed Herdez Competition in 2001, with the No. 16 replaced by Herdez's preference for the No. 55 early in 2002. The team has subsequently gone through further changes in ownership, was once Paul Stoddart's Minardi Team USA, and became Wiggins' HVM Racing competing in the IndyCar Series until the end of the 2012 season. On 11 November, 2015 the team was listed as up for auction officially listing the team as defunct.

He is buried at Crown Hill Cemetery in Indianapolis.

Motorsports career results

NASCAR
(key) (Bold – Pole position awarded by qualifying time. Italics – Pole position earned by points standings or practice time. * – Most laps led.)

Winston Cup Series

Daytona 500

American Open-Wheel racing results

PPG Indycar Series

Indianapolis 500

References

External links

1951 births
2000 deaths
Accidental deaths in Kentucky
Aviators killed in aviation accidents or incidents in the United States
Champ Car drivers
Indianapolis 500 drivers
NASCAR drivers
People from Joliet, Illinois
People from Tinley Park, Illinois
Racing drivers from Illinois
Burials at Crown Hill Cemetery
Bettenhausen family
Victims of aviation accidents or incidents in 2000
IndyCar Series team owners
Bettenhausen Racing drivers
Dale Coyne Racing drivers